Sinan Sandal (born 24 February 1989) is a Turkish judoka.

He is the bronze medallist of the 2017 Judo Grand Prix Zagreb in the -66 kg category.

References

External links

 
 

1989 births
Living people
Turkish male judoka
European Games competitors for Turkey
Judoka at the 2015 European Games
Judoka at the 2019 European Games
Competitors at the 2018 Mediterranean Games
Mediterranean Games competitors for Turkey
21st-century Turkish people